Ruget may refer to two villages in Romania:

 Ruget, a village in Roșia de Amaradia Commune, Gorj County
 Ruget, a village in Vidra Commune, Vrancea County